Atolla is a genus of crown jellyfish in the order Coronatae.  The genus Atolla was originally proposed by Haeckel in 1880 and elevated to the monotypic family level, as Atollidae by Henry Bigelow in 1913.  The six known species inhabit the mesopelagic zone. The medusae possess multiple lobes called lappets at the bell margin. Medusae also have eight tentacles, alternating with eight rhopalia, and twice as many lappets occur as tentacles.

Species
Atolla chuni Vanhöffen, 1902
Atolla gigantea Maas, 1897
Atolla parva Russell, 1958
Atolla reynoldsi Matsumoto et al., 2022
Atolla russeli Repelin, 1962
Atolla tenella Hartlaub, 1909
Atolla vanhoeffeni Russell, 1957
Atolla wyvillei Haeckel, 1880

References

External links
Video of Atolla reynoldsi swimming, by Monterey Bay Aquarium Research Institute, 2022 [scroll down]

Atollidae
Scyphozoan genera
Bioluminescent cnidarians
Taxa named by Ernst Haeckel